Tomlinson M. Holman (born 1946) is an American film theorist, audio engineer, and inventor of film technologies, notably the Lucasfilm's THX sound system. He developed the world's first 10.2 sound system.

Career
Early in his career, Holman developed what was known as the Holman Preamplifier for the APT Corporation, a former Massachusetts entity founded by Holman.  He holds a Bachelor of Science from the University of Illinois at Urbana–Champaign (1968).

In 2002 he received the Academy Award for Technical Achievement. Specifically, for "the research and system integration resulting in the improvement of motion picture loudspeaker systems".

In 2007 he received the IEEE Masaru Ibuka Award.

Holman taught film and television sound at the School of Cinematic Arts, University of Southern California from 1987 to 2011.

In 2011 - 2021, Softpedia reported that Apple Inc. had employed Holman, and speculated that this was to work on audio projects.

Books

 Sound for Film and Television (2001)
 Surround Sound: Up and Running (2008)

See also
James A. Moorer

References

External links
 Holman's current entertainment technology company
 Association for Computing Machinery Video Interviews with Tomlinson Holman

Living people
American acoustical engineers
USC School of Cinematic Arts faculty
University of Illinois Urbana-Champaign alumni
Academy Award for Technical Achievement winners
Film theorists
CAS Career Achievement Award honorees
1946 births
Lucasfilm people